The White Night World Tour is the second world tour by South Korean singer Taeyang. The tour began in Japan with four stadium shows and is set to visit 19 cities around the world.

Background
In Asia, it was announced through YGEX that Taeyang will go on a stadium tour in Japan on March 31, with two shows set to be in Chiba Marine Stadium. On April 21, two new shows were announced on Kobe Sports Park Baseball Stadium, with 140,000 fans are expected to come from 4 shows. His labelmates Winner performed as the opening act for the shows in Chiba on July 8 and 9, while Blackpink opened for him for Kobe shows. On July 6, Taeyang announced via his Instagram two shows in Seoul, on August 26 and 27. The rest of Asia leg was announced on August 10, and to visit 8 countries including Philippines, Hong Kong, Thailand, Indonesia, Malaysia, Macau, Singapore, and Taiwan.

On July 4, it was confirmed that the tour will be a full-scale world tour, and would visit 19 cities around the world. The North America shows were announced on July 12, and set to visit 8 cities with 2 stops in Canada and 6 in the United States. On July 28, the concert in Los Angeles was rescheduled from September 13 to September 12, and the venue was changed from Hollywood Palladium to The Wiltern. The show in Vancouver was sold out. Due to high demand, a second show was added on September 14.

Set list

Tour dates

References

External links
Official Site
YG Entertainment
Big Bang Japan Official Site

2017 concert tours
BigBang (South Korean band) concert tours
Taeyang